Little Black Donald Creek is a stream in Greater Madawaska, Renfrew County in Eastern Ontario, Canada. It is in the Saint Lawrence River drainage basin and is a left tributary of the Madawaska River at Black Donald Lake.

Course
Little Black Donald Creek begins at the south end of Mud Lake. It flows southwest, then turns south. The creek passes under Renfrew County Road 65, and reaches its mouth at the north shore of Black Donald Lake on the Madawaska River. The Madawaska River flows via the Ottawa River to the Saint Lawrence River.

References

Rivers of Renfrew County